Mohammad Davoudi (born 1989 Gonabad گناباد) is an Iranian screenwriter and director. He won the Best Screenplay Award at the 37th Fajr Film Festival for the film Castle of Dreams (2019).

References

Iranian screenwriters
1989 births
Living people
Iranian directors
Crystal Simorgh for Best Screenplay winners